Steinfurt is a Kreis (district) in the northern part of North Rhine-Westphalia, Germany. Neighboring districts are Bentheim, Emsland, district-free Osnabrück and the Osnabrück district, Warendorf, district-free Münster, Coesfeld, Borken.

Geography
The district is situated at the Lower Saxon border, north of Münster. The Ems river runs through the district from south to north. The highest point in the region is the Westerbecker Berg at 234 metres above sea level; the lowest point is Bentlage Castle at 32 metres.

History
In the middle ages and early modern period, Steinfurt was an independent county of the Holy Roman Empire. In 1806, it became part of the Grand Duchy of Berg and in 1815 it became part of the Kingdom of Prussia.

In 1975, the old district Steinfurt was merged with the district Tecklenburg, and together with Greven and Saerbeck from the former district Münster the current district was formed.

Coat of arms
The coat of arms combines elements from the coats of arms of the former districts of Steinfurt, Tecklenburg and Münster. The swan in the middle comes from the countship of Steinfurt, the centre of the district. The red bar around the swan symbolizes the clerical state of Münster, which lay around the dukedom of Steinfurt. The red water lily leaves were symbols of the dukes of Tecklenburg.

Towns and municipalities

Town Twinning
Steinfurt is twinned with:
 Ealing

References

External links

 Official website (German)
 Corpus juris of the Principality of Münster / Steinfurt, Anholt, Gemen

 
Districts of North Rhine-Westphalia